Eileen Weir (born 29 January 1946) is a Canadian former backstroke swimmer. She competed in two events at the 1964 Summer Olympics.

References

External links
 

1946 births
Living people
Canadian female backstroke swimmers
Olympic swimmers of Canada
Swimmers at the 1964 Summer Olympics
Place of birth missing (living people)
Pan American Games bronze medalists for Canada
Pan American Games medalists in swimming
Swimmers at the 1963 Pan American Games
Medalists at the 1963 Pan American Games